Lecythis  is a genus of woody plant in the Lecythidaceae family first described as a genus in 1758. It is native to Central America and South America. Several species produce edible seeds and referred to by a variety of common names including paradise nut, monkey pot, cream nut, and sapucaia nut.

Species

Uses
The nuts of most Lecythis species are edible. Lecythis zabucajo is perhaps the most important edible species, but the seeds of L. ollaria and L. pisonis are also used.

The fruit is coconut-sized, and roundish and woody, with a cap that pops off when it reaches maturity. Inside the fruit are anywhere from eight to 40 seeds, which eventually fall from the woody capsule after a period of time.

The oil extracted from the nuts is tasteless and clear in color. In Brazil it is used for making white soap. It is also burnt as a light source. The wood is used in construction, cabinetry, and the making of tool handles and other wooden items. The seeds are shelled, then eaten raw, roasted or boiled.

Monkey pot
Monkey pot is a common name for many tropical trees in the genus Lecythis and the fruits produced by these trees, particularly Lecythis ollaria of Brazil and Lecythis zabucajo of northeastern South America.  The name is said to derive from an old proverb, "a wise old monkey doesn't stick its hand into a pot", referring to the pot-like fruit that hold the seeds, and monkeys' eagerness to obtain the seeds. Supposedly young monkey's would stick their paw into an almost ripe fruit and would be unable to get it back out for their paws were filled with nuts, while old monkey's would learn it was better to be patient and pull out the nuts one by one.

History 
Because the seeds are rich in oil the plant was brought to Singapore as an experimental economic plant. Jean-Baptiste Christophore Fusée Aublet (1720-1778), discovered the Lecythis zabucajo during his two-year sojourn in French Guiana, where he held the office of Apothecary Botanist. He gathered material for his book, Histoire des Plantes de la Guyane Françoise (The Plant History of French Guiana), which was published in 1775.

References

External links
A website with an exhaustive list of links about Lecythidaceae
Kubitzki (ed.) 2004. The Families and Genera of Vascular Plants. Volume VI. Flowering plants. Dicotyledons. Celastrales, Oxalidales, Rosales, Cornales, Ericales. Springer. Google Books: https://books.google.com/books?id=O-tHGAaaf2cC

 
Ericales genera
Taxonomy articles created by Polbot